So You Wanna Be a Popstar? may refer to:

 So You Wanna Be a Popstar (Dutch TV series)
 So You Wanna Be a Popstar? (New Zealand TV series)